Neelakantan is an Indian surname. It may refer to:

Neelakantan Jayachandran Nair (popularly known as "NJ"), one of the outstanding and decorated officers of the Indian Army
Anand Neelakantan (born 1973), Indian author
K. K. Neelakantan (1923–1992), better known by his pen name Induchoodan, Indian ornithologist
K. S. Neelakantan Unni (1895–1980), Indian Malayalam writer and Sanskrit scholar and translator 
Neelakantan Mullanezhy or just Mullanezhy (1948–2011), Indian Malayalam poet, playwright, lyricist and actor
P. Neelakantan (1916–1992), Indian Tamil film director
R. Neelakantan (died 2018), best known by his stage name Neelu, a Tamil stage, film and television actor
Sunderraman Neelakantan, Indian air force officer and Commander in Chief of the Southern Air Command of the Indian Air Force
Venkateswarier Neelakantan (born 1941), Indian cricketer